Ouk Mic (born 1 January 1980 in Cambodia) is a retired Cambodian footballer who plays for home country club Preah Khan Reach in Metfone C-League as a goalkeeper. He was called up to Cambodia national football team at 2010 AFF Suzuki Cup qualification and 2014 FIFA World Cup qualification against Laos.

References

External links 
 

Living people
1980 births
Cambodian footballers
Cambodia international footballers
Association football goalkeepers
Preah Khan Reach Svay Rieng FC players